Weston is a village in the civil parish of Welford in the English county of Berkshire.

History
The Domesday book recorded that Weston was a manor under the control of the "Abingdon Abbey" in 1086.

Geography

It is situated approximately halfway between Great Shefford and Welford on the River Lambourn in the district of West Berkshire. The M4 motorway runs close by. There is a common in Weston, Marsh Common, located between the watermill and the disused railway. The mill is a Grade II listed building.

References

External links

Villages in Berkshire
Welford, Berkshire